Azaleodes brachyceros is a moth of the family Palaephatidae. It is known only from the Upper Allyn River in New South Wales, Australia.

External links
Australian Faunal Directory
Image at CSIRO Entomology
Moths of Australia

Moths of Australia
Palaephatidae
Moths described in 1987